Michael Hennigan (born 20 December 1942) is an English retired professional football player and manager.

Career

Playing career
Hennigan played as a central defender and began his career with the youth team of Sheffield Wednesday, but he never made a first team league appearance. Hennigan later played in the Football League for Southampton and Brighton & Hove Albion, before moving to South Africa to play with Durban United.

Managerial career
Hennigan briefly took joint temporary management of Blackpool in 1999, along with Mike Davies, after the departure of Nigel Worthington.

Hennigan managed the Malawi national side in 2005.

References

External links
Mike Hennigan - A Tribute by John Doxey

1942 births
Living people
People from Thrybergh
Sportspeople from Yorkshire
English footballers
Association football defenders
Sheffield Wednesday F.C. players
Southampton F.C. players
Brighton & Hove Albion F.C. players
Durban United F.C. players
English Football League players
English football managers
Blackpool F.C. managers
Malawi national football team managers
Expatriate football managers in Malawi